Ploshcha Lva Tolstoho is a station on Kyiv Metro's Obolonsko–Teremkivska Line. The station was opened on 19 December 1981, and is named after the writer Leo Tolstoy (who visited Kyiv only once). It was designed by N.A. Levchuk and V.B. Zhezheryn.

The station is located deep underground and consists of a central hall with arcades in the walls. The central hall has been covered with orange-coloured marble and is lit by chandeliers and decorative lamps placed on the walls. Passenger tunnels connect the station to the Leo Tolstoy Square and another street.

The station forms a station complex with a transfer tunnel with the adjoining Palats Sportu station on the Syretsko-Pecherska Line.

Voters chose to rename the station Vasyl Stus - another choice was Lina Kostenko - in a May 20212 online poll (with 170,000 respondents) taken during the 2022 Russian invasion of Ukraine.

On Friday 13 January 2023 the Kyiv City Council announced the metro station would be renamed. In a poll organised by them Kyiv residents cast more than 100,000 votes for the renaming of seven city objects, including this and the metro station Druzhby Narodiv. The majority of the votes went to the name Ukrainian Heroes Square.

References

External links
 Kyivsky Metropoliten — Station description and photographs 
 Metropoliten.kiev.ua — Station description and photographs 

Kyiv Metro stations
Railway stations opened in 1981
1981 establishments in Ukraine